Treasures.tv was a television channel in the United Kingdom. It began broadcasting on Sky Digital on 21 November 2005, it has now closed, the EPG slot was taken by Jewellery Maker on 1 May 2018, as part of a major reshuffle.

It was a home shopping channel which sells antiques, collectables, memorabilia and modern limited editions.

Television channels in the United Kingdom
Television channels and stations established in 2005
Defunct television channels in the United Kingdom